The Netherlands men's national under-21 field hockey team represents the Netherlands in men's international under-21 field hockey and is controlled by the Koninklijke Nederlandse Hockey Bond, the governing body for field hockey in the Netherlands.

The team competes in the Men's EuroHockey Junior Championships which they have won a record ten times. They have also appeared in all Junior World Cups where their best result is winning the silver medal in 1985 and 2009.

Tournament record

Junior World Cup
 1979 – 
 1982 – 6th place
 1985 – 
 1989 – 9th place
 1993 – 4th place
 1997 – 7th place
 2001 – 8th place
 2005 – 5th place
 2009 – 
 2013 – 
 2016 – 7th place
 2021 – 5th place
 2023 – Qualified

EuroHockey Junior Championship
 1976 – 
 1977 – 
 1978 – 
 1981 – 
 1984 – 
 1988 – 
 1992 – 
 1996 – 
 1998 – 
 2000 – 
 2002 – 
 2004 – 
 2006 – 
 2008 – 
 2010 – 
 2012 – 
 2014 – 
 2017 – 
 2019 – 
 2022 – 

Source:

Players

Current squad
The following 18 players were named on 14 July 2022 for the 2022 Men's EuroHockey Junior Championship in Ghent, Belgium from 24 to 30 July 2022.

Caps updated as of 30 July 2022, after the match against Germany.

Recent call-ups
The following players have also been called up to the squad within the last twelve months.

See also
 Netherlands men's national field hockey team
 Netherlands women's national under-21 field hockey team

References

Under-21
Men's national under-21 field hockey teams
Field hockey